Tillandsia hasei is a species in the genus Tillandsia. This species is endemic to Bolivia.

References

hasei
Flora of Bolivia